Derek Lerner (born 1974 in Jacksonville, Florida), is an American contemporary artist primarily known. for his ink on paper  abstract  drawings, currently living and working in New York City. Lerner's art has been exhibited nationally and internationally including; Robert Henry Contemporary in Brooklyn, NY, Rochester Contemporary Art Center, Montserrat Galleries – Montserrat College of Art in Beverly, MA, Museum of Contemporary Art – Chicago , Museo de la Ciudad de Mexico, Centre d’Exposition de Val-d’Or<ref>"TRAFIC art exhibit at Centre d’Exposition de Val-d’Or", L'Écart, The Internet Archive Wayback Machine, Quebec, Canada, October 8, 2008. Retrieved October 8, 2008.</ref> in Quebec, Canada and  University of Massachusetts.

 Education and early life 
Lerner was born on March 2, 1974, in Jacksonville, Florida. In 1988 his high school curriculum was a half-day program split between two schools, Ed White for standard academics and Westside Skills Center, where he studied commercial art . In 1990 Lerner transferred schools to study Visual art at Douglas Anderson School of the Arts, and later attended Atlanta College of Art (ACA) in 1992, graduating with a BFA in 1995. While at ACA, he studied art alongside Kara Walker, Radcliffe Bailey, Roe Ethridge, and William Downs. During Lerner's senior year of study at ACA he  interned at The Interactive Media Technology Center (IMTC) at Georgia Tech, remaining there as a graphic and motion design staff member until exiting in 1995.

Career
In 1994 while attending university Lerner cofounded Graphic Havoc, an award winningIn march of 2012 the work GRAPHIC HAVOC and Wolff Olins completed for Current TV was awarded best of the Logo and Identity Animation category in the 2011 Brand New Awards which is a judged competition organized by UnderConsideration, celebrating the best identity work produced around the world each year.2018 Emmy Award, Current Affairs Category – branding and art direction for White Right: Meeting the Enemy documentary film directed by Deeyah Khan art direction and design company with Randall J Lane, which shortly thereafter grew to include David W Merten, Peter J Rentz, and Sadek Bazaraa. While functioning as a business owner, creative director, art director and graphic designer Lerner continued to create and exhibit his artwork. Lerner currently maintains an art studio in Brooklyn

Solo exhibitions
2017 In Between, Robert Henry Contemporary, Brooklyn, NY
2017 42°33'00.51" N 70°52'33.57" W, Curated by Leonie Bradbury, Montserrat Galleries – Carol Schlosberg Alumni Gallery, Beverly, MA
2016 VOLTA12, Robert Henry Contemporary, Markthalle, Basel, SwitzerlandKordic, Angie. Widewalls, What to See at VOLTA 12 Basel Art Fair, London, England, April 30, 2016
2015 VOLTA NY, Robert Henry Contemporary, New York, NY
2014 Convenient Gratification, Robert Henry Contemporary, Brooklyn, NY
2012 RHV Fine Art, Brooklyn, NY
2003 ONEHUNDREDEIGHT Freestyle Drawings on Cardboard, Tomoya Saito Gallery, Ebisu, Tokyo, Japan
2001 Ecko Unltd showroom, New York, NY
2001 DL27 SHOWROOM, New York, NY

Group exhibitions
2019 Dataism, ArtsWestchester, Curated by Amy Kurlander and Lise Prown, White Plains, NY
2019 Datum Drawing, University of Massachusetts Amherst, Curated by Sandy Litchfield, Amherst, MA
2018 Shoot The Pump, Bullet Space, Curated by Lee Quiñones, Alexandra Rojas, and Andrew Castrucci, New York, NY
2017 Points of Departure; Meditations on Mapping, Mercer Gallery (Monroe Community College), curated by Colleen Buzzard and Karen Sardisco, Rochester, NY
2017 INTERFERENCE, Bullet Space, curated by Alexandra Rojas, New York, NY
2017 Abstract Art in Dialogue, NYSID Gallery and organized by The Central Academy of Fine Arts, Co-curated by Dr. Zhijian Qian and Dr. Yu Ding, New York, NY
2016 PULSE – Contemporary Art Fair, Robert Henry Contemporary, Miami, FL
2015 Brooklyn Bridge, Rochester Contemporary Art Center, Rochester, NY
2012 The 15 Year Anniversary Retrospective, Young Blood Gallery, Atlanta, GA
2012 Mapping the Equivocal, Robert Henry Contemporary, Brooklyn, NY
2010 Select Media Festival 9: Infoporn II, Co-Prosperity Sphere, Chicago, IL
2010  Conflux Festival, 5 block radius surrounding NYU's Barney Building, New York, NY
2010 FAD Digital Arts Festival, Quina Galeria, Edificio Maleta, downtown Belo Horizonte , Brazil
2010 August 7 screening, Berkeley Commonplace, Berkeley, CA
2010 Draw, Museo de la Ciudad de Mexico, Mexico City, Mexico
2009 Draw, Shooting Gallery, San Francisco, CA
2008 Connected Unconscious, Brooklyn Academy of Music, Brooklyn, NY
2008 Draw, StolenSpace Gallery, London, UK
2007 Our Space CREAM 5th Anniversary, Kapok, Hong Kong
2007 Draw as part of the SXSW Music-Film + Interactive Festival, Gallery Lombardi, Austin, Texas
2006 Draw, Fuse Gallery, New York, NY
2006 Invitational Alumni Exhibition, Douglas Anderson School of the Arts, Jacksonville, FL
2005 FUFI FUFI, TypeStereo & Freegums mobile gallery, Art Basel, Miami, FL
2005 Job 36:1, Graphic Havoc collaboration 222gallery, Philadelphia, PA
2005 My Moleskine, Tsutaya Tokyo Roppongi, Tokyo, Japan
2005 TRAFIC, Centre d’exposition de Val-d’Or, Val-d’Or (Québec)
2005WE BARTER, Life in a Box Project, Fabrica Features, Hong Kong
2003 BLING, Derek Lerner and Tom Sanford, 31GRAND, Brooklyn, NY
2002 the big group show, M3Projects Gallery, Graphic Havoc collaboration, New York, NY
2002 SK8 ON THE WALL, Graphic Havoc collaboration, Gallery Rocket, Tokyo, Japan
2002 Triple Five Soul VS Graphic Havoc, 290 Lafayette St., New York, NY 
2002 XHAND, 222gallery, Philadelphia, PA
2002 Coded Language, City Gallery Chastain, Atlanta, GA
2002 VERSION>02, Museum of Contemporary Art, Chicago, IL
2001 Looser Graffiti, FAXWARS collaboration, YoungBlood Gallery, Atlanta, GA
2001 ARKITIP EXHIBITION002, Graphic Havoc collaboration, alife, New York, NY
2001 Krylon and Beyond 2, YoungBlood Gallery, Atlanta, GA
1999 transparent horizons, MACHINE collaboration,  NEXUS Atlanta Contemporary Art Center, Atlanta, GA
1995 Senior Exhibition, The Atlanta College of Art Gallery, Atlanta, GA
1995 Drawing, gallery 100, Atlanta, GA
1994 Printmaking, Gallery 100, Atlanta, GA

Commissions

2018 "Infrastructure 2p1", site-specific commission for Lululemon Athletica, Time Warner Center, Columbus Circle, New York City, 79" x 324" printed vinyl wall art instillation.

In 2015, MTA Arts & Design a division of the Metropolitan Transportation Authority commissioned Lerner to create permanent public art for the Avenue X subway station in Brooklyn. The artwork consists of six 48" x 150" multi-panel laminated glass compositions. As part of his MTA commission Lerner's artwork was additionally paired with a poem by Pulitzer Prize awarded &  US Poet Laureate Charles Simic for Poetry in Motion bus and subway posters. The drawing and poem are included in the book titled, "The Best of Poetry in Motion: Celebrating 25 Years on Subways and Buses”, published by W. W. Norton & Company.

Recognition
In 2020 Lerner became a recipient of an  NYSCA/NYFA Artist Fellowship for drawing.

Artists' books
2018 CACHE¹, hardcover, 252 pages, edition of 10 signed and numbered – plus 6 A/Ps
2018 CACHE², hardcover, 252 pages, edition of 10 signed and numbered – plus 6 A/Ps

 Collections
ElephanArt, Zurich Switzerland
The Capital One Art Collection 
Norwegian Cruise Line Art Collection 

Bibliography
2019 "Fracture 13" drawing by Derek Lerner used as book cover art for Oxford University Press publication titled "Disorderly Borders: How International Law Shapes Irregular Migration" by Chantal J.M. Thomas 
2019 Robert Henry Contemporary : Studio Visit, interview, January
 2018 For the Unconventional, interview, November
2017 Derek Lerner on His Drawings Show in Bushwick at Robert Henry Contemporary By Noah Becker, WHITEHOT Magazine, October
2015 Spatial preoccupations "Brooklyn Bridge" By Rebecca Rafferty, Rochester City Newspaper, ARTS & ENTERTAINMENT, September 9
2015 Derek Lerner and Bleu Cease. ROCO "Brooklyn Bridge" exhibition. Interview. WUHF Good Day Rochester. Fox Rochester. September 4. Television
2015 Brooklyn Bridge art exhibit at RoCo by Robin L. Flanigan, Democrat & Chronicle, September 6
2014 ARTSEEN "DEREK LERNER Convenient Gratification" by Taney Roniger, "The Brooklyn Rail", July
2007 Interview with Derek Lerner, "Our Space", CREAM No. 08, Hong Kong, October
2004 GH avisualagency, London, Booth-Clibborn Editions, 
2004 MAN VS. MACHINE by Graphic Havoc, "Technology", BIG No. 51, New York
2003 Übersee 2, "From Surface into Space", Die Gestalten Verlag, Berlin, FebruaryÜbersee 2, “From Surface into Space”, Die Gestalten Verlag, Berlin, February, Amazon (company)
2003 Tray Butler, All in the wrist, "Shelf Space", Creative Loafing, Atlanta, February 12
2002 Broken Wrist Project, Book 1, Los Angeles
2002 The Elizabeth Kent Story'', Brooklyn, Graphic Havoc
2002 Derek Lerner SHOW&TELL Fig.A, "Digital Détournement", Select Magazine No. 3, Chicago, April

References

External links

Living people
1974 births
People from Jacksonville, Florida
Artists from Atlanta
Artists from New York City
Atlanta College of Art alumni